Leonid Rivkind (born 23 January 1991 in Kaliningrad, Russia) is a Russian and Israeli male curler.

Teams and events

Men's

Mixed

Mixed doubles

References

External links

Living people
1991 births
Sportspeople from Kaliningrad
Russian male curlers
Israeli male curlers